St Finian's (Swords) GAA is a Gaelic Athletic Association club in based in the River Valley area of Swords in the north of County Dublin.

The club fields teams at adult and juvenile level in camogie, hurling, and ladies' and men's football.

Honours
 Dublin Junior Football Championship: winner 2000
 Dublin AFL Div. 3 winner 2012

References

External links
Official website

Gaelic games clubs in Fingal
Gaelic football clubs in Fingal